Dyrzela is a genus of moths of the family Noctuidae.

Species
 Dyrzela bosca Swinhoe, 1890
 Dyrzela boscoides Holloway, 1989
 Dyrzela castanea Warren, 1913
 Dyrzela incrassata Walker, 1858
 Dyrzela increnulata Warren, 1913
 Dyrzela plagiata Walker, 1858
 Dyrzela roseata Holloway, 1989
 Dyrzela squamata Warren, 1913
 Dyrzela trichoptera Robinson, 1975
 Dyrzela tumidimacula Warren, 1913
 Dyrzela violacea Holloway, 1989

References
Natural History Museum Lepidoptera genus database
Dyrzela at funet

Hadeninae